Gotlandic is the form of Swedish spoken on the islands of Gotland and Fårö in the Baltic Sea.

The dialect has to be distinguished from Gutnish (Gutamål), which is the autochthonous language on the islands and which was spoken well into the 20th century, it is estimated that around 2,000 to 5,000 people still speak Gutnish today. The Gotlandic dialect is characterized by a special singing language melody and by a lot of diphthongs (like Gutnish), but is otherwise quite close to standard Swedish in inflection and syntax. In contrast to Gutnish the Gotlandic dialect has fewer features in common with the Old Gutnish language. 

The following table shows some differences between Gotlandic and Gutnish.

References

Gotland
Swedish language
Swedish dialects